Zabrus estrellanus is a species of ground beetle in the Iberozabrus subgenus that is endemic to Portugal.

References

Beetles described in 1880
Beetles of Europe
Endemic arthropods of Portugal
Zabrus